Luis Giannattasio Finocchietti (19 November 1894 – 7 February 1965) was a Uruguayan political figure.

Background 
Giannattasio was an engineer by profession and a leading member of the Uruguayan Blanco (National) Party.

From 1959 to 1963, he served as Minister of Public Works. In this capacity, Giannattasio was particularly identified with a significant road-building program.

President of Uruguay

1964 
In 1962 he was elected a member of the National Council of Government. He became President of the body in 1964, succeeding his National Party colleague Daniel Fernández Crespo. Prominent members of his Administration included Health minister Aparicio Méndez, who later served as President of Uruguay.

1965: Death in office 
In 1965 Giannattasio died in office shortly after attending in official capacity the funeral in London, England, of Winston Churchill.

He was succeeded as President of the National Council of Government by Washington Beltrán, also of the Blanco (National) Party.

Legacy
A road in Canelones Department is named after Giannattasio.

Among the prominent Uruguayan buildings for which Giannattassio's engineering company (Giannattasio & Berta, afterwards Ingeniería Civil) was responsible is the main building of The British Schools of Montevideo, Carrasco, opened 1964, as well as the main branch of Banco de la República, Av. 18 de Julio, downtown Montevideo.

See also 
 Politics of Uruguay
 The British Schools of Montevideo#History
 List of political families#Uruguay

References 

Presidents of the National Council of Government (Uruguay)
People from Montevideo
Uruguayan civil engineers
Uruguayan people of Italian descent
1894 births
1965 deaths
Place of birth missing
National Party (Uruguay) politicians